Ventura Díaz (born 26 August 1937) is a Spanish former road cyclist, who competed professionally from 1961 to 1976. He competed in the individual road race at the 1960 Summer Olympics. He also rode in thirteen editions of the Vuelta a España, finishing 9th in 1974, as well as two of the Tour de France and one Giro d'Italia. His biggest wins were the 1970 Vuelta a los Valles Mineros and the 1970 Vuelta a la Comunidad Valenciana.

Major results

1961
 1st Stage 9 Volta a Catalunya
 2nd Subida a Arrate
1962
 1st Stage 3 Vuelta a la Comunidad Valenciana
1963
 1st Stage 1a (TTT) Vuelta a la Comunidad Valenciana
 3rd GP Ayutamiento de Bilbao
 9th Overall Eibarko Bizikleta
1964
 1st Stage 8 Tour de l'Avenir
1965
 2nd  Team time trial, UCI World Road Championships
 2nd Subida al Naranco
1966
 2nd Overall Vuelta a La Rioja
 7th Overall Eibarko Bizikleta
1967
 2nd Subida a Arrate
 10th Overall Setmana Catalana de Ciclisme
1968
 3rd National Hill Climb Championships
1969
 3rd Subida a Urkiola
1970
 1st  Overall Vuelta a los Valles Mineros
1st Stage 2a
 1st  Overall Vuelta a la Comunidad Valenciana
 1st Stage 3 Grand Prix du Midi Libre
 5th Overall Setmana Catalana de Ciclisme
 7th Overall Volta a Catalunya
 7th Overall Tour of the Basque Country
 9th Overall Vuelta a Andalucía
1971
 10th Overall Vuelta a Andalucía
1972
 4th Overall Tour of the Basque Country
 8th Overall Critérium du Dauphiné Libéré
1973
 1st Stage 3 Vuelta a La Rioja
 1st Stage 2 Vuelta a Segovia
 3rd Klasika Primavera
 7th Overall Tour of the Basque Country
 7th Overall Vuelta a Andalucía
 8th Overall Setmana Catalana de Ciclisme
 10th Subida a Arrate
1974
 1st Stage 4b Vuelta a Cantabria
 3rd Overall Vuelta a los Valles Mineros
 3rd National Cyclo-cross Championships
 6th Overall Volta a Catalunya
 9th Overall Vuelta a España
1975
 1st Stage 5a Tour of the Basque Country
 2nd GP Vizcaya
 3rd GP Llodio

References

External links
 

1937 births
Living people
Spanish male cyclists
Olympic cyclists of Spain
Cyclists at the 1960 Summer Olympics
Sportspeople from Santander, Spain
Cyclists from Cantabria
20th-century Spanish people